was a Japanese visual kei metal band formed in 2003.

History 
Deathgaze was formed in the summer of 2003 by Hazuki, Ai, Naoki, and Kanna. After releasing their first EP, "294036224052", vocalist, Hazuki, left in spring 2004 to form his own band, lynch. Guitarist Kanna also left in 2004. As replacements, vocalist Sou and guitarist Naoto joined the group in late 2004. The band released several more singles and their first album, before Sou left in late 2006 to marry. The band then did a tour without vocalist with girugamesh titled "Girugaze&Deathgamesh", with bassist Ai and girugamesh vocalist Satoshi sharing vocal duties. In March 2007 the band announced they would be on hiatus while searching for a new vocalist.

On November 11, 2007, the band officially ended their hiatus with bassist Ai becoming the band's vocalist. They continued as a three-member band until April 2008 when Kosuke joined the band to relieve Ai of bass duties. On April 26, 2009, guitarist Naoto retired from the band and from music, but he stated that if possible in the future he would return. After Naoto's retirement, Takaki (ex. ASS'n'ARROW) played live support guitar for the band, while Ai contributed guitar work to "The Continuation" and "Blood." Takaki was added as an official member on November 20, 2009. From 2010 on, Ai also took up the rhythm guitar in some of the band's songs.

As of 2012, Deathgaze has released five albums and several singles. Ai is the main composer and lyricist of the band, and was so even when he was still the band's bassist. He is also in charge of art direction for their CD releases. From 2003 to 2007 the band also performed under the session name Knohhoso (野っ細), playing cover songs of older and popular Japanese rock bands. Knohhoso also featured Ai on vocals.

On March 23, 2013, Deathgaze announced that they would be playing in venues all around Europe for their European Tour commemorating their 10th anniversary. This included cities such as Paris, Wroclaw, Hamburg, Vienna and more.

On October 2, 2014, the band has officially announced a status of indefinite hiatus, pausing their career for the time being.

Members
 Ai (藍) – lead vocals (2007–2014), rhythm guitar (2009–2014), bass, backing vocals (2003–2008)
 Naoki (直樹) – drums (2003–2014)
 Kosuke (孝介) – bass, backing vocals (2008–2014)
 Takaki (貴樹) – lead guitar, backing vocals (2009–2014)

Former members
 Hazuki (葉月) – lead vocals (2003–2004)
 Kanna (柑那) – guitars (2003–2004)
 Sou (宗) – lead vocals (2004–2006)
 Naoto (直人) – guitars (2004-2009)

Timeline

Discography
Albums
 Genocide and Mass Murder (July 16, 2006)
 Awake -Evoke the Urge- (December 10, 2008)
 The Continuation (September 9, 2009)
 Bliss Out (December 8, 2010)
 Creature (April 4, 2012)
 ENIGMA (July 23, 2014)
EPs
 "「294036224052」" (February 22, 2004)
 "genocidal freaks death code=[2F0U0C6K1E2R1!0]" (December 10, 2006)

Compilations
 Decade (July 7, 2013) (Best of, containing seven re-recorded tracks and a new song)
Singles
 "Chaos" (February 5, 2005)
 "Chaos Vol. 2" (August 17, 2005)
 "Downer" (November 11, 2005)
 "腐敗と腐生"(Fuhai to Fusei) (April 1, 2006)
 "Insult Kiss Me" (January 23, 2008)
 "Dearest" (February 20, 2008)
 "I'm Broken Baby" (March 19, 2008)
 "Abyss" (July 24, 2008)
 "Blood" (November 18, 2009)
 "Sorrow" (May 26, 2010)
 "Silence/The End" (May 7, 2011)
 "Useless Sun" (November 2, 2011)
 "Dead Blaze" (November 21, 2012)
 "Allure" (May 22, 2013)
 "THE UNDERWORLD" (December 18, 2013)

Omnibus
 Hevn.8号 - "リヒトゾイレ"(Lichtsäule) (November, 2003)
 Nagoya Band Catalog 2006 Rebels - "Reborn" (July 19, 2006)
 Visualy[zm] The Cure Century - "Insult Kiss Me" (July 30, 2008)

Live
 Bloody All Lovers (March 22, 2010)
 Bliss Out Mind -From the End- (February 22, 2012)

References

External links
 Official website
 Knohhoso website

Visual kei musical groups
Japanese metalcore musical groups
Japanese alternative metal musical groups
Japanese melodic death metal musical groups
Musical quartets
Musical groups established in 2003
Musical groups from Aichi Prefecture